Janet Barrowman was a Scottish suffragette.

Women's Suffrage 
Barrowman was born in Glasgow. Her father was a lime merchant. She was a member of the Women's Social and Political Union.

In 1912, she participated in militant activity during the campaign for women's suffrage alongside Helen Crawfurd, Annie Swan and others, breaking a window valued at 4 shillings. She was arrested and sentenced to two months hard labour in Holloway. Barrowman smuggled poetry out of Holloway and these were published by the Glasgow branch of the WSPU as "Holloway Jingles" in 1912. She lost her job as a clerk as a result of her arrest, and did not take part in any more militant acts. She gained another job, in which she worked until she retired.

Legacy
Barrowman's copy of the poetry book, published by the Glasgow branch of the Women's Social and Political Union, was gifted in 1947 to Dr Charity Taylor, the governor of HM Prison Holloway, and it was auctioned by Pickering and Chatto in 2018.

She donated her collection of memorabilia to Glasgow Museums in 1955.

Likenesses
Photograph with Helen Crawfurd in The National.

References

Writers from Glasgow
Scottish suffragettes
1879 births
1955 deaths
Women's Social and Political Union
20th-century Scottish women writers